Antoine Sartorio (27 January 1885, Menton – 19 February 1988, Jouques) was a French sculptor.

Brief biography

Antoine Sartorio was born in Menton on 27 January 1885 and died in Jouques on 19 February 1988. He studied at the École des Beaux-Arts de Paris.

His relationship with the Marseille architect Gaston Castel, students together at the École des Beaux-Arts, led to his involvement with the Santos monument Andradas in 1922, work on the Opéra de Marseille in 1924, the Marseille Monument de l'Armée d'Orient in 1927, the works La Méditerranée" and "La Durance" for the Cavaillon bridge in 1932, decoration on the Marseille Palais de Justice in 1933, work on the monument to Alexandre 1er de Yougoslavie in 1938 and the "sept péchés" for Marseille's Baumettes Prison, also in 1938. He also worked with Paul Tournon.

As with most French sculptors he was commissioned after the 1914–1918 war to work on several war memorials such as those at Tournon-sur-Rhône and Menton.

He also contributed sculptures to the Lycée Tolbiac in Paris and the Lycées Marseilleveyre and Périer in Marseille and worked on the restoration of the "Le Baptême de Clovis" for Reims cathedral from 1962 to 1966.

In 1967 he left Paris and retired to Jouques.

His work had been shown at the Exhibition des Arts Décoratifs in Paris in 1925, at the "Exposition Coloniale de Vincennes" in 1931 and the "Exposition Universelle" in Paris in 1937.

War memorials
When war broke out in 1914, Sartorio was called up to the 363rd Infantry regiment and saw action particularly in the Vosges. He was awarded the Croix de Guerre and whilst serving in the area around Senones, Sartorio created several memorials. These works helped to build his reputation and he was commissioned to create a temporary cenotaph placed under the Arc de Triomphe for the great victory celebrations held in Paris on 14 July 1919.

Main works

Further reading
 Roger François, Le soldat-sculpteur Antoine Sartorio ou Journées ordinaires de guerre autour de Senones, 1914–1916, Société philomatique vosgienne. Saint-Dié-des-Vosges, 1999, 59 pages.

References

20th-century French sculptors
French male sculptors
Prix de Rome for sculpture
Chevaliers of the Légion d'honneur
1885 births
People from Menton
1988 deaths
French centenarians
Men centenarians